America: A Tribute to Heroes was a benefit concert created by the heads of the four major American broadcast networks; Fox, ABC, NBC and CBS. Joel Gallen was selected by them to produce and run the show. Actor George Clooney organized celebrities to perform and to staff the telephone bank.

It was broadcast live by the four major American television networks and all of the cable networks in the aftermath of the September 11 attacks on the World Trade Center and the Pentagon in 2001. Done in the style of a telethon, it featured a number of national and international entertainers performing to raise money for the victims and their families, particularly the New York City firefighters and New York City police officers. It aired September 21, 2001, uninterrupted and commercial-free, for which it won a Peabody Award. It was released on December 4, 2001, on compact disc and DVD.

On a dark stage illuminated by hundreds of candles, twenty-one artists performed songs of mourning and hope, while various actors and other celebrities delivered short spoken messages. The musical performances took place at three studios in Los Angeles (CBS Television City), New York, and London, while the celebrity messages took place in Los Angeles. Some of the musicians, including Neil Young and Eddie Vedder, were heard working the phone banks taking pledges. Over $200 million was raised and given to the United Way's September 11 Telethon Fund.

In 2004, Rolling Stone magazine selected this concert, along with the Concert for New York City, as one of the 50 moments that changed rock and roll. The show was also simulcast in Canada.

Performers
 Bruce Springsteen: "My City of Ruins", a song he had performed at only a few New Jersey shows. Written before the September 11 attacks, it is actually about his home town Asbury Park, New Jersey; with a few phrases slightly modified, and introduced as "a prayer for our fallen brothers and sisters." It appeared on his The Rising album the following year.
 Stevie Wonder with Take 6: "Love's in Need of Love Today", from his 1976 album Songs in the Key of Life.
 U2 with Dave Stewart, Natalie Imbruglia and Morleigh Steinberg: "Peace on Earth" (intro)/"Walk On", both from their 2000 album All That You Can't Leave Behind. This performance was beamed via satellite from London.
 Faith Hill: "There Will Come a Day", from her 1999 album Breathe. For this performance, Hill was joined by a gospel choir and special guest Paul Shaffer on keyboards.
 Tom Petty and the Heartbreakers: "I Won't Back Down", from Petty's 1989 solo album Full Moon Fever.
 Enrique Iglesias: "Hero", which had just been released as his new single.
 Neil Young: John Lennon's "Imagine", which Young never recorded previously.
 Alicia Keys: Donny Hathaway's "Someday We'll All Be Free", which Keys never recorded previously.
 Goo Goo Dolls' John Rzeznik and Limp Bizkit's Fred Durst and Wes Borland: Pink Floyd's "Wish You Were Here", with some new lyrics written for the occasion. Neither the Goo Goo Dolls nor Limp Bizkit recorded the song previously.
 Billy Joel: "New York State of Mind", from his 1976 album Turnstiles.
 Dixie Chicks:  "I Believe In Love", a new song which appeared on their Home album the following year.
 Dave Matthews: Solo performance of "Everyday", from the Dave Matthews Band 2001 album Everyday.
 Wyclef Jean: Bob Marley and The Wailers' "Redemption Song", which Jean never recorded previously.
 Mariah Carey: "Hero", from her 1993 album Music Box.
 Jon Bon Jovi and Richie Sambora of Bon Jovi: "Livin' on a Prayer", from their 1986 album Slippery When Wet. It was performed as an acoustic version, with two guitars, percussion and a violin.
 Sheryl Crow: "Safe and Sound", a new song which appeared on her C'mon, C'mon album the following year.
 Sting: "Fragile", from his 1987 album ...Nothing Like the Sun.
 Pearl Jam's Eddie Vedder and Mike McCready with Neil Young: "Long Road", a song originally appearing on Pearl Jam's Merkin Ball EP in 1995.
 Paul Simon: "Bridge Over Troubled Water", from the 1970 Simon & Garfunkel album Bridge Over Troubled Water.
 Céline Dion: "God Bless America" (as arranged by David Foster).
 Willie Nelson accompanied by the entire Los Angeles-based ensemble: "America the Beautiful".

Speakers
Tom Hanks
George Clooney
Will Smith
Muhammad Ali
Kelsey Grammer
Jim Carrey
Cameron Diaz
Robin Williams
Dennis Franz
Jimmy Smits
Calista Flockhart
Amy Brenneman
Conan O'Brien
Sarah Jessica Parker
Tom Cruise
Ray Romano
Lucy Liu
Sela Ward
Jane Kaczmarek
Julia Roberts
Chris Rock
Robert De Niro
Clint Eastwood

Broadcasters
Over 35 network and cable outlets simultaneously broadcast America: A Tribute to Heroes, including: ABC, CBS, Fox, NBC, A&E, BET, Country Music Television, Comedy Central, Court TV, Discovery Channel, E!, ESPN, Fox Family, Fox Sports Net, FX, Galavision, Hallmark Channel, HBO, Lifetime, MTV, Oxygen, PAX, PBS, Sci-Fi, Showtime, Sundance Channel, Telemundo, TLC, TNN, TNT, The WB, Turner South, Univision, UPN, USA Network and VH1.

America: A Tribute to Heroes was simulcast on the Internet at www.tributetoheroes.org and at America Online, as well as on more than 8,000 radio outlets around the country, including Westwood One, Clear Channel Communications and ABC Radio affiliates in major markets.

Internationally, America: A Tribute to Heroes was distributed to broadcasters in more than 210 countries around the world including BBC One in the United Kingdom. Further, the American Forces Network carried the program live on radio and television to American soldiers, sailors, airmen and marines in over 175 countries around the world.

Charts

Weekly charts

Year-end charts

See also
The Concert for New York City
United We Stand: What More Can I Give
Hope for Haiti Now: A Global Benefit for Earthquake Relief

References

External links
 
 Jammin' with Neil How and why Neil Young chose Imagine

Benefit concerts in the United States
Peabody Award-winning broadcasts
American telethons
Aftermath of the September 11 attacks
2001 video albums
2001 live albums
Live video albums
Simulcasts
2001 in American television
2001 television specials